Justin Rice Whiting (February 18, 1847 – January 31, 1903) was a politician from the U.S. state of Michigan.

Whiting was born in Bath, New York, and moved to Michigan in 1849 with his parents, who settled in St. Clair, Michigan. He attended the public schools and the University of Michigan at Ann Arbor from 1863 to 1865. He worked as a merchant and manufacturer. Whiting was elected mayor of St. Clair in 1879 and represented the 17th District in the Michigan State Senate in 1882.

He was elected as a Democrat from Michigan's 7th congressional district to the 50th United States Congress and reelected to the 51st, 52nd, and 53rd Congresses, serving from March 4, 1887 until March 3, 1895. After leaving Congress, Whiting resumed his former business pursuits in St. Clair.  He was an unsuccessful Fusion candidate for Governor of Michigan in 1898, losing to incumbent Republican Hazen S. Pingree. He also ran for election in 1900 to the 57th Congress, losing to incumbent Republican Edgar Weeks.

Whiting married Emily F. Owen, with whom he had 10 children. Their son, also named Justin Rice Whiting (1886–1965), was president of the Consumers Power Company from 1949 to 1959.

Whiting also served as chairman of the Democratic State central committee. He died in St. Clair and is interred there at Hillside Cemetery.

References

The Political Graveyard

1847 births
1903 deaths
Burials in Michigan
Democratic Party members of the United States House of Representatives from Michigan
Mayors of places in Michigan
Michigan Silverites
Democratic Party Michigan state senators
People from Bath, New York
People from St. Clair, Michigan
University of Michigan alumni
19th-century American politicians